Musical Romance (Spanish: Romance musical) is a 1947 Argentine musical comedy film directed by Ernesto Arancibia and starring Libertad Lamarque.

The film's sets were designed by the art director Ralph Pappier.

Cast
 Libertad Lamarque 
 Juan José Miguez
 Carlos Castro 
 Bertha Moss 
 Ernesto Raquén 
 Julio Renato 
 Enrique de Rosas
 Amelia Senisterra 
 Miriam Sucre 
 Elena Zucotti

External links
 

1947 films
1940s Spanish-language films
Argentine black-and-white films
Films directed by Ernesto Arancibia
Films scored by Alejandro Gutiérrez del Barrio
Argentine musical comedy films
1947 musical comedy films
1940s Argentine films